The term secular saint, which has no strict definition, generally refers to someone venerated and respected for contributions to a noble cause, but not recognized as a canonical saint by a religion. The ranks of secular saints, like those of religious ones, are often filled by martyrs.

George Orwell began his "Reflections on Gandhi": "Saints should always be judged guilty until they are proved innocent…" Orwell concluded his essay with an attack on the idea of sainthood but praise for Gandhi:One may feel, as I do, a sort of aesthetic distaste for Gandhi, one may reject the claims of sainthood made on his behalf (he never made any such claim himself, by the way), one may also reject sainthood as an ideal and therefore feel that Gandhi's basic aims were anti-human and reactionary: but regarded simply as a politician, and compared with the other leading political figures of our time, how clean a smell he has managed to leave behind! 

The term has also been applied to the incel community, which has been observed referring to mass-killer Elliot Rodger as 'Saint Elliot' within the online spaces and discourses of the community. Academics have suggested that, while the incel community is apparently nonreligious, their treatment of Rodger suggests that he has been appointed to a position that functionally operates as that of a saint within the community.

See also
 Beatification
 Canonization
 Hagiography
 Saint
 Folk saint
 Phallic saint
 Military saint

Notes

References and further reading 

 "The Path of Brighteousness" by Cullen Murphy for The Atlantic (November 2003)
 

Types of saints
Secularism